Harvest is a 1967 American documentary film produced by Carroll Ballard. It was nominated for an Academy Award for Best Documentary Feature. The film portrays the American farm and farmer at harvest time, beginning in Texas with the first cutting of winter wheat, and following the season north to the Canada–United States border.

See also
List of American films of 1967

References

External links

1967 films
1967 documentary films
American documentary films
Documentary films about agriculture in the United States
1960s English-language films
1960s American films